Urval is a commune in the Dordogne department in Nouvelle-Aquitaine in southwestern France. It is situated near the left bank of the river Dordogne, southeast of Le Buisson-de-Cadouin. It was part of the commune of Le Buisson-de-Cadouin between 1974 and 1989.

Sights
 Château de la Bourlie, with French formal garden

Population

See also
Communes of the Dordogne department

References

Communes of Dordogne